Arif Erkin Güzelbeyoğlu (born 11 September 1935) is a Turkish actor and musician. He started his acting career by acting in Keşanlı Ali Destanı in 1970. He is best known with the character of Mala Ahmet in the film The White Angel.

Filmography
 Güven Bana (2023)
 Menajerimi Ara (Kendisi) (2020)
 Güvercin (2019-2020)
 Çici Babam (Abdukadir'in Dedesi) (2018)
 Vezir Parmagi (Koyun Dedesi) (2017)
 Aile Arasinda (Dede) (2017)
 Bütün Saadetler Mümkündür (2017)
 Çoban Yıldızı (2017)
 Aşk Yalanı Sever (2016)
 Güzel Köylü (Rifat) (2014-2015)
 Kadim Dostum (2014)
 Doksanlar (2013-2014)
 Benimle Oynar misit (Seref Baba) (2013)
 Old Clock (2012)
 Muhteşem Yüzyıl (Piri Mehmet Paşa) (2011-2014)
 Hayat Devam Ediyor (İbrahim Bakırcı) (2011-2013)
 Canım Ailem (Cabbar Ağa) (2009-2010)
 Gecenin Kanatlari (Hasan) (2009)
 Tatlı Bela Fadime (Temel Dede) (2008)
 Arka Sokaklar (2008)
 Kalbsiz Adam (Ekrem) (2008)
 Kara Yılan (Mamo Ağa) (2007)
 Beyaz Melek (2007)
 Yabancı Damat (Memik Dede) (2004-2007)
 Halk duşmani (2004)
 Sultan Makami (2003)
 Yeditepe İstanbul (Hüseyin) (2001-2002)
 İkinci Bahar (Zülfikar Ağa) (1998-2001)
 Yazlıkçılar (Cavit) (1993-1998)
 Bir milyara bir čocuk (1990)
 Bizimkiler (Katil Yavuzun Agabeyi) (1989-1991)
 Kasanli Ali destani (1988)

References

External links
 

Living people
Turkish male film actors
Turkish male television actors
1935 births
People from Gaziantep